The Group A of the 25th Arabian Gulf Cup is one of the two groups of competing nations in the 25th Arabian Gulf Cup. It consists of Iraq, Yemen, Saudi Arabia and Oman. The matches will take place from 6 to 12 January 2023.

Teams

Standings

Matches

Iraq vs Oman

Yemen vs Saudi Arabia

Oman vs Yemen

Saudi Arabia vs Iraq

Iraq vs Yemen

Saudi Arabia vs Oman

Discipline
Fair play points would have been used as tiebreakers if the overall and head-to-head records of teams were tied. These were calculated based on yellow and red cards received in all group matches as follows:
first yellow card: −1 point;
indirect red card (second yellow card): −3 points;
direct red card: −4 points;
yellow card and direct red card: −5 points;

Only one of the above deductions was applied to a player in a single match.

References 

Group A